Bosnia and Herzegovina has a multi-party system, with numerous parties in which no one often has a chance of gaining power alone, and parties must work with each other to form coalition governments.

List

Represented in the Parliamentary Assembly

Represented in Entity Parliaments

Extra-parliamentary parties

Defunct and historical parties

See also
Politics of Bosnia and Herzegovina
Elections in Bosnia and Herzegovina
List of political parties in Republika Srpska

References

 
Bosnia
Political parties
Political parties
Bosnia and Herzegovina